Castle Hill is a suburb of the town of Ipswich, partly in the ward of Castle Hill, in the Ipswich district, in the county of Suffolk, England. Castle Hill United Reformed Church was completed in 1956. There was a Roman villa at Castle Hill.

Under what is now housing in Tranmere Grove and Chesterfield Drive lies the remains of a Roman villa. It was excavated in 1931 and again in 1949 before residential building started. Coins were found along with a mosaic floor which is on display in Ipswich Museum. It featured on Channel 4's archaeological television programme Time Team in 2004. The dig helped provide more evidence to supplement that gathered in the 1949 dig by archaeologist Basil Brown. This area has for centuries been called Castle Hill but there never was a castle. Castlehill Farm stood just yards away prior to the housing scheme.

Amenities
Castle Hill has a primary and secondary school, a post office, a pub, two churches and an arcade of shops on both    Fircroft Road and Garrick Way.

References

Philip's Street Atlas Suffolk (page 135)

External links
Time Team investigation of Castle Hill

Ipswich Districts